The 2023 Newfoundland and Labrador Scotties Tournament of Hearts, the women's provincial curling championship for Newfoundland and Labrador, was held from January 26 to 29 at the RE/MAX Centre in St. John's, Newfoundland and Labrador. The winning Stacie Curtis rink represented Newfoundland and Labrador at the 2023 Scotties Tournament of Hearts in Kamloops, British Columbia, and finished eighth in Pool B with a 2–6 record. The event was held in conjunction with the 2023 Newfoundland and Labrador Tankard, the provincial men's championship.

This was the first time since 2021 that the event has been held due to the COVID-19 pandemic in Canada.

Teams
The teams are listed as follows:

Round-robin standings
Final round-robin standings

Round-robin results
All draw times are listed in Newfoundland Time (UTC−03:30).

Draw 1
Thursday, January 26, 1:30 pm

Draw 2
Thursday, January 26, 7:00 pm

Draw 3
Friday, January 27, 1:30 pm

Draw 4
Friday, January 27, 7:00 pm

Draw 5
Saturday, January 28, 9:00 am

Draw 6
Saturday, January 28, 7:30 pm

Playoff

Final
Sunday, January 29, 2:00 pm

References

External links

Newfoundland and Labrador
Curling in Newfoundland and Labrador
January 2023 sports events in Canada
2023 in Newfoundland and Labrador
Sport in St. John's, Newfoundland and Labrador